Brock is a village in the Canadian province of Saskatchewan within the Rural Municipality of Kindersley No. 290 and Census Division No. 13. The village is located 165 km southwest of the City of Saskatoon.

History 
Brock incorporated as a village on July 7, 1910. Brock was named for Isaac Brock, hero of the War of 1812.

Demographics 

Notable people 
 John Badham, sportscaster inducted into the Canadian Football Hall of Fame
 Steve MacIntyre, professional ice hockey player

See also 
 List of communities in Saskatchewan
 List of villages in Saskatchewan

References 

Villages in Saskatchewan
Kindersley No. 290, Saskatchewan
Division No. 13, Saskatchewan